Semiotus superbus is a species of beetle belonging to the family Elateridae.

Description
Basic colour of the body is peach-yellow to ochreous yellow. Pronotum with broad black stripe extending from base to apex or
with sanguineus stripe separating two black vittae. Elytra have 5 (including sutural vitta) black vittae.

Distribution
This Andean species occurs from Costa Rica to Bolivia.

References

Elateridae
Beetles of South America
Beetles described in 1866